Patrick Kennison is an American rock musician. He co-founded The Union Underground who played on Ozzfest 2001 and released an album An Education in Rebellion which sold 350,000 copies. Union Underground broke up due to musical differences with Kennison forming a new band 3-Faced with Marty O'Brien.

In early 2008, he formed a new band called Heaven Below, serving as its lead singer.

In 2011, Kennison toured with Jani Lane.

In November 2014, he joined Lita Ford's band.

On Sundays in February 2022, Kennison and Heaven Below/The Iron Maidens guitarist Nikki Stringfield will perform during their residency at Hard Rock Cafe in Hollywood, California.

On 26 June 2022, Kennison plans to release Live in the Living Room which he created with Stringfield.  The two plan to perform that same date at Hard Rock Cafe in Hollywood, California.

Additionally, on the last 2 Wednesdays in July 2022, Kennison plans to perform at the same venue with Stringfield.

Discography

As producer

Nikki Stringfield 
Harmonies for the Haunted (2019)

As featured artist

William Shatner 
Seeking Major Tom (2011)

Rob Zombie 
 "Two-Lane Blacktop" (2003)

Heaven Below

Studio albums 
 Countdown to Devil (2009)
 Falling From Zero (2012)
 Good Morning Apocalypse (2016)
 TBD (2023)

Other albums 
 We Sold Our Soul for Heaven Below (2008)
 Infamy (EP) (2008)
 Reworking the Devil (2009)
 Heaven Below (2010)
 Unleashed in the West (2011)
 The Mirror Never Lies: Mega-Single (2011)
 Dos Diablos Digital Box Set (2013)
 The Deadlight Sessions (2013)
 Sleeping Giants (2013)
 Demonic Demos & Unsung Lullabies (2014)
 Rest in Pieces (2020)

Union Underground 
...An Education in Rebellion (2000)

Solo career 
 Live in the Living Room (with Nikki Stringfield) (2022)

References 

Year of birth missing (living people)
Living people
American rock singers
American rock guitarists
American male guitarists
Heaven Below members